Brian Bithell (born 5 October 1956) is an English former footballer who played as a defender for Stoke City, Port Vale, Wimbledon, Macclesfield Town, Stafford Rangers, Congleton Town and Rhyl.

Career
Bithell started his career with Stoke City. He started 16 First Division games in the 1976–77 season, as both Tony Waddington and George Eastham proved unable to lead the "Potters" away from the relegation zone. He never featured in the Second Division, and instead crossed the Potteries divide in September 1977 to spend time on loan with Roy Sproson's Port Vale in the Third Division. He only played two games at Vale Park, before returning to the Victoria Ground the following month. He joined Dario Gradi's Wimbledon in December 1977, featuring in six Fourth Division games towards the end of the 1977–78 season. After leaving Plough Lane he left the Football League, and later played for Macclesfield Town (Northern Premier League), Stafford Rangers (Northern Premier League), Congleton Town and Rhyl. After retiring, he worked as a manager at a Tesco in Middlewich.

Career statistics
Source:

References

1956 births
Living people
Sportspeople from Watford
English footballers
Association football defenders
Stoke City F.C. players
Port Vale F.C. players
Wimbledon F.C. players
Macclesfield Town F.C. players
Stafford Rangers F.C. players
Congleton Town F.C. players
Rhyl F.C. players
English Football League players
Northern Premier League players